Philip Southern is a freelance prize-winning photographer from Warren, Michigan.

History
Southern has worked as a freelance photographer for Michigan newspapers in. He has also shot products for companies such as General Motors in Detroit and done photojournalism in Thailand and Brazil. He graduated in April from Eastern Michigan University with a degree in Business. He recently moved to Los Angeles and is currently doing set photography for "It's Me Again" featuring Della Reese.

YOBI.tv
In 2009, while still a senior at Eastern Michigan University, Southern won the YOBI Pics contest from YOBI.tv's first season for his entry "Lee Plaza." He won $10,000.00 and tickets for two to a grand opening of a major collection showing at the Annenberg Space for Photography in Los Angeles and VIP access to the lecture series and workshops at the museum.

Winning Entry
"Lee Plaza" is a photo depicting a broken piano inside of a broken down building in Detroit. In describing the prize-winning photo, Southern indicated that he loves, "thinking about the history of the place. Who used to come there and what their lives were like."

References

External links
 Phil's Personal Website
 Phil on Flickr
 Phil's YOBI.tv Profile
 Phil's MySpace
 On photo.net

Categories

1986 births
Living people
American photographers
People from Warren, Michigan
Eastern Michigan University alumni